Som is a village in Siófok District, Somogy County, Hungary.

Notable people
Béla Iványi-Grünwald - painter

References

External links
 Street map (Hungarian)

Populated places in Somogy County